The Nicoamen Plateau is a small sub-plateau of the Thompson Plateau in the southern Interior of British Columbia, Canada, located between the Nicoamen River (W) and the lower valley of the Nicola River (E).

References

Interior Plateau
Nicola Country
Thompson Country